The R671 road is a regional road in Ireland. It travels from Clonmel, County Tipperary to the N25 road in County Waterford, via the villages of Ballymacarbry and Clashmore. It follows the route of the former national trunk road T27.

References

Regional roads in the Republic of Ireland
Roads in County Tipperary
Roads in County Waterford